Robert Fisher Gibson Jr. (November 22, 1906 - September 21, 1990) was the tenth bishop of Virginia in The Episcopal Church.

Early life and education
Gibson graduated from the Virginia Theological Seminary and University of the South in Sewanee, Tennessee, at both of which he later taught.

Ministry
Gibson was ordained a deacon in June 1940 by Presiding Bishop Henry St. George Tucker and as a priest 6 months later by Bishop Frederick D. Goodwin. He served in two parishes and traveled to Mexico for missionary work. After that he embarked on the commencement of his academic career of teaching church history at Virginia Theological Seminary and later as dean of at Sewanee, The University of the South.

Gibson was consecrated as Suffragan bishop of the Diocese of Virginia in 1949 and in 1954 the diocesan convention elected him as Coadjutor bishop of Virginia. In 1961 he became the diocesan bishop. In addition to his diocesan duties, including support for the ordination of women as priests, Bishop Gibson was an outspoken supporter of ecumenism, and served as chairman of the Consultation on Church Union in the 1960s, although their plan to merge eight major Protestant denominations into a 24-million-member church was never consummated. He also served as vice president of the House of Bishops.

He retired as bishop in 1974, having called for a bishop coadjutor in 1966, and that coadjutor, Robert Bruce Hall succeeded him as the diocese's 11th bishop. One of his suffragan bishops, Philip Alan Smith was elected coadjutor of the Episcopal Diocese of New Hampshire, and would become that diocese's 7th bishop. He remained active in church matters until his death, of a heart attack, in Richmond.

References

1990 deaths
1906 births
20th-century Anglican bishops in the United States
Sewanee: The University of the South alumni
Sewanee: The University of the South faculty
Virginia Theological Seminary alumni
Virginia Theological Seminary faculty
People from Williamsport, Pennsylvania
Religious leaders from Pennsylvania
Episcopal bishops of Virginia